Noor Mohamed Hassanali (13 August 1918 – 25 August 2006) was the second president of Trinidad and Tobago (1987–1997). A retired high-court judge, Hassanali was the first person of Indian descent along with being the first Muslim to hold the office of President of Trinidad and Tobago, and he was the first Muslim head of state in the Americas.

Hassanali was president during the 1990 Jamaat al Muslimeen coup attempt when an Islamist group bombed the nation's police headquarters, stormed its Parliament and took the prime minister and his Cabinet hostage. Hassanali, who was visiting London at the time and remained there until the government regained control, aided in calming his fellow citizens and getting rule of law and democracy back on track on his return. His tenure which was largely ceremonial was noted for its efforts to bridge the nation's racial divide and building consensus between various political parties.

Biography
The sixth of seven children, Hassanali was born into a Muslim Indo-Trinidadian family in San Fernando, Trinidad and Tobago. He attended the Corinth Canadian Mission Primary School and Naparima College. After graduating he taught at Naparima from 1938 to 1943. In 1943 he travelled to Canada, where he studied at the University of Toronto.

Hassanali was described as "one of the most neutral, reserved, and dignified figures in the history of T&T politics". When he was inaugurated as president in 1987 he was described as "a person of impeccable credentials who has a reputation for honesty and humility of the highest order." As a Muslim, Hassanali chose not to serve alcoholic beverages at President's House. Despite reservations on the part of Prime Minister A. N. R. Robinson, the decision was never seen as controversial by the public.

Hassanali succeeded acting president Ellis Clarke (1976–1987) and was himself succeeded by Arthur N. R. Robinson (president 1997–2003).

Hassanali died on 25 August 2006 at his home in Westmoorings, Trinidad and Tobago, at the age of 88. He had suffered from hypertension for the preceding year. Hassanali was buried later in the day, following Islamic rites, in the Western Cemetery in Saint James, Trinidad and Tobago.

References
Citations

Sources
 Biography from Nalis.
 Biographical summary from Nalis.
 Noor Hassanali: Trinidad's Living Legend – Nancy Graydon, Border Lines, University of Toronto; Fall 2003.
 Hassanalis 50th Anniversary – Angela Pidduck

1918 births
2006 deaths
Presidents of Trinidad and Tobago
Trinidad and Tobago people of Indian descent
University of Toronto alumni
Trinidad and Tobago Muslims
20th-century Trinidad and Tobago judges
Trinidad and Tobago politicians of Indian descent
British Trinidad and Tobago judges
People from San Fernando, Trinidad and Tobago